Epidendrum difforme (the "Differently Formed Epidendrum")  is a species of orchid in the genus Epidendrum. In 1861, Müller classified this species in the subsection Umbellata of the section Planifolia of subgenus Euepidendrum Lindl. of the genus Epidendrum.

The diploid chromosome number of E. difforme has been determined both as 2n = 40 and as 2n = 39.

References

Reichenbach, H. G. "Orchides" in Müller, C. Ed. Walpers Annales Botanices Systematicae 6(1861)402-403. Berlin.

External links

difforme